China's current mainly market economy features a high degree of income inequality. According to the Asian Development Bank Institute, “before China implemented reform and opening-up policies in 1978, its income distribution pattern was characterized as egalitarian in all aspects.”  At this time, the Gini coefficient for rural – urban inequality was only 0.16. As of 2012, the official Gini coefficient in China was 0.474, although that number has been disputed by scholars who “suggest China’s inequality is actually far greater.” A study published in the PNAS estimated that China's Gini coefficient increased from 0.30 to 0.55 between 1980 and 2002.

History
In a landmark paper published in the Review of Development Economics, economists Ravi Kanbur and Xiaobo Zhang conclude that there have been three peaks of inequality in China in the last fifty years, “coinciding with the Great Famine of the late 1950s, the Cultural Revolution of the late 1960s and 1970s, and finally the period of openness and global integration in the late 1990s.”  Their research indicates that these periods of inequality are driven by “three key policy variables – the ratio of heavy industry to gross output value, the degree of decentralization, and the degree of openness.” The study finds that the “heavy-industry development strategy played a key role in forming the enormous rural-urban gap in the pre-reform period, while openness and decentralization contributed to the rapid increase in inland-coastal disparity in the reform period of the 1980s and 90s.” In other words, heavy industry development in the cities formed the initial rural-urban gap leading up to the reform period, and decentralization increased overall inequality, rural-urban inequality, and inland-coastal inequality as the economy opened up after the 1978 economic reforms. Research conducted by Jeffrey Sachs on the entire period from 1952 to 1996  indicates that in general, regional income inequalities are driven by government policy, whereas income divergence is "strongly associated with the extent of marketization and openness."

Current state 
China is a newly industrialized country and an emerging economy, with quarterly GDP growth rates averaging 9.31% for the past two decades, powered mainly by strong exports. However, China still faces a number of socioeconomic issues, including the increasing income disparity between different groups of citizens, largely characterized by rural-urban income inequality. Despite steady growth of China's economy since economic reforms in 1978, the rural-urban income gap reached its widest in more than three decades in 2009. According to data from National Bureau of Statistics of China, at its widest disparity, city dwellers were earning 3.33 times as much as farmers (income ratio of 3.33:1), with per capita disposable income of urban households standing at RMB17175 while per capita net income of rural households at RMB5153. In contrast, the income disparity was at its narrowest in 1983, at 1.82:1, due to effects of the Household-responsibility system introduced in 1978. As of year 2010, income ratio was recorded at 3.23:1 and per capita disposable income of urban households stood at RMB19109 while rural households’ were at RMB5919. In 2014, according to an Institute of Social Science Survey, Peking University, income inequality among Chinese mainland citizens has reached severe conditions, with 1% of the Chinese population possessing 1/3 of the country's wealth.

In 2012, a report published by Southwestern University of Finance and Economics estimated the Gini index of China at 0.61

China's government publishes an official yearly calculation of the country's Gini index. According to these reports, the average Gini coefficient between residents was .475 between the years of 2003 and 2018, reaching a high of 0.491 in 2008 and a low of 0.462 in 2015.

Factors

Urban-biased policies
More than 10% of China's total inequality is attributed to the rural-urban gap, according to a study published in the PNAS. Research conducted by Dennis Tao Yang published in the journal of the American Economic Association indicates that the root of China's rural-urban divide “lies in the strategy of the centrally planned system that favored heavy-industry development and extracted agricultural surplus largely for urban capital accumulation and urban-based subsidies.” In the 1980s and 1990s, state investments in the rural economy accounted for “less than 10 percent of the budget, despite the fact that the rural population was about 73-76 percent of the national population.” Additionally, factor market distortions have created significant rural-urban inequalities. More specifically, research published in the Journal of Economic Modelling demonstrates that the Hukou system and absence of a fully functioning land market are two main drivers of rural-urban inequality.

Inland-coastal inequality
As is well documented in many studies, rural-urban inequality is a major contributing factor to general income inequality in China. However, “while the contribution of rural-urban inequality is much higher than that of inland-coastal inequality in terms of levels, the trend is very different. The rural-urban contribution has not changed very much over time, but the inland-coastal contribution has increased by several fold,” meaning that inland-coastal inequality is playing an increasingly important role in the formation of general income inequality across China. A study found that variations across Chinese provinces account for about 12% of the country's overall income inequality. Research on economic growth after the opening of the Chinese economy has shown that between 1989 and 2004, income in coastal provinces more than tripled whilst that in inland provinces doubled. Research on inland-coastal inequality indicates that "since being a coastal province is a geographic advantage that will persist, this tendency for divergence will also probably continue," but institutional factors still have a significant effect. Economists Ravi Kanbur and Xiao Zhang propose that the “greater ease of rural-to-urban migration within provinces, compared to the institutional and other difficulties of migrating from inland to coastal provinces” can partially explain this phenomenon. China's Hukou system (户口) is an institutional factor that significantly inhibits interprovincial migration. Recently, the government has introduced policies that relax Hukou related restrictions in small and medium-sized cities, in an effort to encourage growth. “Currently rural incomes are less equally distributed than urban incomes but urban inequality is increasing faster than rural inequality” (Wu, 2005, p. 773).

Education
According to research conducted at the World Bank, “inequality of access to education is an important source of inequality in China across people contemporaneously and across generations.” In fact, “a decomposition analysis based on household income determination shows that the largest proportion of changes in total income can be attributed to the increase in returns to education.” Urban-biased policies and inland-coastal inequality exacerbates the issue of education inequality in China. One of the primary issues is their generation of sector-biased income transfers and expenditures on health, housing and education, which "not only distort economic incentives of the workers in the sectors, but will also affect the human-capital attainments of their children, which may further widen the rural-urban income gap." In other words, inland and rural inequality can help create a vicious cycle by funneling money towards the coastal cities and away from investments in human capital elsewhere. Like in the United States, education funding is primarily the responsibility of local governments in China. As poor localities are less able to fund these services and poor households are less able to afford the high private cost of basic education, China has seen an increase in the inequality of education outcomes. “For example, in 1998, per pupil expenditure in Beijing was 12 times that in Guizhou, and the difference jumped to 15 times in 2001.”

Demographic Change
According to research published in the China Economic Review, population aging is “largely responsible for the sharp increase in income inequality in rural China,” especially at the beginning of the 2000s. As a result of Chinese governmental attempts to control population growth with the one-child policy implemented in 1979, many fewer young adults have reached the working age over the course of the past decade, leading to a significant “fall in the ratio of household members of working age.” This created a labor shortage, which in combination with the rapid expansion of industrialization served to increase income inequality.  Beyond income inequality, this research also indicates that “an imbalanced population structure will influence the social and economic development in many other respects.” The researchers recommend serious reconsideration of the one-child policy to mitigate these effects. Recently in 2019, measures to redact or modify the one-child policy have been reviewed and ratified to be put into place. Its ramifications and consequences yet to be seen.

Impact
In December 2009, a survey conducted by the Economy and Nation Weekly magazine of Xinhua news revealed that 34 out of the 50 leading Chinese economists surveyed think of income inequality as a challenge to China's sustainable development. Economist Kenneth Rogoff also cautioned on the problem of income inequality, commenting that “There is no doubt that income inequality is the single biggest threat to social stability around the world, whether it is in the United States, the European periphery, or China.” Income inequality is argued to be a menace to social stability, and potentially causes a disappearance of middle class capital that would impede China's economic growth.

“Hu Angang, an influential researcher in China, warned that further increases in regional disparities may lead to China’s dissolution, like in the former Yugoslavia,” while other scholars have noted that “further expansions of the differences may create serious social and political problems, generate nationalist conflicts and negatively influence China’s economic and social stability.”
“The current institutions and policies are detrimental to China’s future growth because the sector-biased income transfers and expenditures on health, housing, and education not only distort economic incentives of the workers in the sectors, but will also affect the human-capital attainments of their children, which may further widen the rural-urban income gap.” In other words, current income inequality created largely as a result of government policy favoring urban centers begets further rural-urban income inequality, which creates a vicious cycle and further reinforces regional and rural-urban inequalities.

Policy recommendations

Economic reform
	Research published by the International Monetary Fund indicates that “continuing with the current growth pattern would further increase already high investment and saving needs to unsustainable levels, lower urban employment growth, and widen the rural-urban income gap.”  Instead, they recommend reducing subsidies to industry and investment, encouraging the development of the services industry, and reducing barriers to labor mobility, believing that this would result in a “more balanced growth with an investment-to-GDP ratio that is consistent with medium-term saving trends, faster growth in urban employment, and a substantial reduction in the income gap between rural and urban residents.” With regard to labor mobility reform, research published in the journal of Economic Modelling suggests that reforms in the rural land rental market and Hukou system alongside efforts to increase off-farm labor mobility would dramatically reduce the urban-rural income ratio. Additionally, the research states that “the combination of WTO accession and factor market reforms improves both efficiency and equality significantly.”  WTO accession means that the economy will become more liberalized and open, “likely resulting in dramatic shifts in regional comparative advantages.”  This regional disparity will likely be exacerbated by continued government investment in coastal regions, so “further liberalizing and investing in the economy in the inland region is thus an important developmental strategy for the government to both promote economic growth and reduce regional inequality.”

Social policy reform
Analysis of the impact of the one-child policy indicates that “population aging will impact society in multiple ways, and it is therefore crucial for policy makers to produce a development strategy that tackles the socio-economic challenges of an aging population.” Some specific recommendations from the School of Public Finance and Public Policy of Beijing include “the establishment of a basic old age security system in rural areas” to reduce income inequality, encouragement of development of local industry in less affluent regions, subsidization of children's education in lower income households, and the establishment of public health insurance plans for the poor.” Additionally, the report finds that “In the long run, the Chinese government should reconsider whether the one-child policy should be continued. As an interim policy, it has achieved its objective, and now is the time for adjusting the policy.”
	Research from the World Bank indicates that while inequality of income can be inevitable at certain stages of development, inequality of opportunity will undermine long-term development prospects. In order to enhance growth and fight poverty, it will therefore be important to improve access to basic education, especially in poor rural areas.

Fiscal policy reform

China already has a tax and redistribution system. It is divided into 9 income groups. The first bracket for salaries exceeding 800 yuan (or US$96.4) is taxed at 5%, the last bracket for incomes exceeding 100,000 yuan (or US$12,000) is taxed at 45%. 
There is also a tax system for craftsmen. This one is based on 5 tranches and not 9. The highest rate is 35%.
However, it seems that this tax system cannot really be effective in reducing inequalities. This is for several reasons. 
China faces significant corruption problems that make this tax system illegitimate and difficult to enforce. Tax payers consider that the taxes they pay will go to a privileged minority, which is why, in practice, this tax system is not legitimate.

Corruption is already a major issue for China. According to a study, 50% of state-owned companies, 60% of joint venture companies and 100% of craftsmen practice tax evasion in China. In the 1980s, commercial and industrial evasion increased considerably to reach 100 billion yuan in 1989, or about 10% of national income. Income tax evasion reached 95%, according to Ministry of Security sources between 1985 and 1988 there were 8900 cases of tax revolt, 1500 tax inspectors were injured, 872 were in critical condition, 28 were disabled, and 4 died. During the first six months of 1990, there were 1352 cases of tax revolts, 1047 tax inspectors injured, 127 critically ill and disabled, and 3 dead. In 1992 and 1993, there were 2744 and 2967 violent events against payment of taxes respectively.

See also 
 Poverty in China
 Economy of China
Education in China
 Social issues in China
 Income tax in China

Further reading

References 

Income distribution
Income in China
Economic inequality
China